Lideta (Amharic: ልደታ ክፍለ ከተማ) is a district of Addis Ababa, Ethiopia. As of 2011 its population was of 214,769.

Geography
The district is located in the central-western area of the city, nearby the centre. It borders with the districts of Addis Ketema, Arada, Kirkos, Nifas Silk-Lafto and Kolfe Keranio.

List of places
 Little Texas

Admin Level: 11
 Abnet Square
 Agusta
 Berbere Berenda
 Ched Tera
 Coca
 Darmar
 Geja Seffer
 Golla Mikael
 Goma Kuteba
 Jos Hansen
 Ketena Hulet 
 Mechare Meda 
 Microlink Project
 Mobil
 Molla Maru
 Sengatera
 Tekle Haymanot
 Tor Hayloch

See also
 Lideta Army Airport
 Lideta Catholic Cathedral School
 Lideta Nyala
 National Archives and Library of Ethiopia

References

External links

Districts of Addis Ababa